Jean-Baptiste Auguste Imbert (3 March 1791, in Paris –  1840, in Brussels) was a 19th-century French playwright, bookseller, publisher, historian, chansonnier and journalist.

Biography 
He first worked in various jurisdictions before being named secretary in November 1816 of the Joint Committee established near the Prussian army in France.

After the departure of the Allies, he became a bookseller in Paris and also published under the pseudonyms "De Saint-Eugène", "Rossignol", "Passe-Partout" or simply "Auguste". On 4 January 1827, he was sentenced to a 595 francs fine and costs by the Criminal Court of the Seine department for defamation and incitement to hatred and contempt to King's government for his work Biographie des imprimeurs et des libraires. All the same, he had trouble with the law for his book Mon rêve, ou le gouvernement des animaux (1828). Banished, he moved to Brussels where he ended his life.

Moreover, Imbert was editor in different literary journals such as le Corsaire et La Lorgnette and published a great number of songs, among others in the Almanach des Grâces, the Almanach des Muses and the Veillées françaises.

His plays were presented on the most important Parisian stages of the 19th century, including the Théâtre de la Porte Saint-Martin and the Théâtre de l'Odéon.

Works 

1814: Traits remarquables du règne de Napoléon
1817: La Dinde en pal ou un Trait d'Henri IV, historical comedy mingled with couplets
1818: Réflexions sur le prisonnier de Rouen ou Histoire du soi-disant faux dauphin
1818: Les Veillées d'une captive, with Antony Béraud and Louis-François L'Héritier
1820: La Sœur Anne, ou le Billet à payer, one-act intermède, mingled with couplets
1821: La petite somnambule, one-act comedy lacrina-comique, mingled with couplets
1822: Fanfan Ducroquet, sortant de la 1re représentation de Azéma, ou le Père meurtrier de sa fille , pantomime
1823: Émélie, ou la Petite glaneuse, drama by Berquin, arranged on one act and set in vaudeville
1824: Voyage autour du Pont-Neuf, et promenade sur le quai aux Fleurs
1824: La Chaumière du vieux soldat, song
1825: Azéma, ou l'Infanticide, roman historique tiré des causes célèbres de l'Angleterre, 2 vol.
1825: L'Enfant des tours Notre-Dame, ou Ma vie de garçon, historical novel
1825: Petit Berquin en miniature ; théâtre d'éducation pour le premier âge
1825: L'Étude du cœur, ou les Leçons paternelles, novel
1826: Biographie des imprimeurs et des libraires, précédée d'un coup d'œil sur la librairie
1827: Biographie des condamnés pour délits politiques, with Benjamin-Louis Bellet
1827: Le Petit marchand, ou Chacun son commerce, one-act vaudeville, from a tale by Ducray-Duménil, with Paul Auguste Gombault and Eugène Hyacinthe Laffillard
1828: Les Deux Amis, two-act vaudeville
1828: La Mystification ou Le Comité de lecture, one-act comedy
1828: Mon rêve, ou le gouvernement des animaux
1828: Tablettes bruxelloises, ou Usages, mœurs et coutumes de Bruxelles, with Bellet
1830: La Bobineautiade, ou Coup-d'œil critique sur le théâtre du Luxembourg, satire en 2 chants
1830: Histoire de la révolution des quatre-vingt-seize heures, de ses causes et de ses effets ; suivie des Traits de bravoure, de patriotisme, de dévouement, d'humanité et de désintéressement, qui ont eu lieu pendant les mémorables journées des 26, 27, 28 et 29 juillet 1830
1831: Le Bâtard d'une haute et puissante dame, 2 volumes
1833: L'Écu de cinq francs, capilotade
1838: Le Démérite des femmes

Bibliography 
 Auguste Joseph de Reume, Notices bio-bibliographiques sur quelques imprimeurs, 1858, (p. 29) (read online) 
 Joseph-Marie Quérard, Les supercheries littéraires dévoilées, 1869, (p. 395)

19th-century French dramatists and playwrights
19th-century French historians
19th-century French journalists
French male journalists
French chansonniers
1791 births
Writers from Paris
1840 deaths
19th-century French male writers